The İkiztepe oil field is an oil field located in Batman, Batman Province, Southeastern Anatolia Region. It was discovered in 1988 and developed by Türkiye Petrolleri Anonim Ortaklığı. It began production in 1990 and produces oil.

References

Oil fields in Turkey
Buildings and structures in Batman Province
Geography of Batman Province
1988 establishments in Turkey